Somkid Chamnarnsilp (born January 7, 1993), simply known as Heem is a Thai footballer who plays as a forward for Thai League 1 club Sukhothai.

International career
In 2016, Somkid has called to practiced with Thailand U-23 national football team but he has not been the last 23 players to competed in the 2016 AFC U-23 Championship in Qatar.

Honours

Club
Chiangrai United
Thai League 1 (1): 2019
 Thai FA Cup (1): 2020–21
 Thailand Champions Cup (1): 2020

References

External links
 Somkid Chamnarnsilp's info at Thai league official website – thaileague.co.th.
 

1993 births
Living people
Somkid Chamnarnsilp
Association football forwards
Somkid Chamnarnsilp
Somkid Chamnarnsilp
Somkid Chamnarnsilp
Somkid Chamnarnsilp
Somkid Chamnarnsilp